Bowling Green Ballpark is a 4,559-seat stadium in Downtown Bowling Green, Kentucky. It is primarily used for baseball and is home to the Bowling Green Hot Rods of the High-A East of Minor League Baseball. This state-of-the-art stadium opened with Citizens First Opening Night on April 17, 2009 to a standing room only crowd of 6,886. The Bowling Green Hot Rods defeated the Kannapolis Intimidators 8–4 in this much anticipated opening game that brought professional baseball to Bowling Green for the first time in 67 years. Many ceremonial "first" pitches were thrown, and the starting lineup of the Hot Rods were driven onto the field by locally owned vintage Hot Rods. The offices for the Bowling Green Hot Rods and several other touches were finally completed after the 2009 season.

The ballpark is also used occasionally by the Western Kentucky Hilltoppers baseball team to host high profiles games, such as the 2017 and 2019 game against the Kentucky Wildcats baseball.

Ballpark Features

Bowling Green Ballpark was designed by architectural firm DLR Group. The right-centerfield wall in Bowling Green Ballpark is unique in that it is concave in right-center because of the shape of a pre-existing road behind the field. The scoreboard in right-centerfield measures 35-feet tall and 56-feet wide, with the ability to show scoring, live video, advertisements, player statistics, and more. Embedded in the left field wall is a 6-foot, 3inch tall by 68-foot wide LED display board, behind which is a picnic area. There are two grass lawn seating areas- one in left-center and one at the right field line. The kids play area boasts an inflatable car customized with the Hot Rods' logo, a carousel, and a playground, and a behind the batter's eye in centerfield, a splash-pad. The Reinhart Club is a bar located on suite level directly behind home plate. Also on the suite level are 10 suites, the Hall of Fame suite, and a party deck—The Coca-Cola Deck.

Events
From May 23–27, 2012, the venue hosted the 2012 Sun Belt Conference baseball tournament, which was won by Louisiana–Monroe.

Multiple concerts have also taken place at Bowling Green Ballpark, including Florida Georgia Line and Nelly, Jake Owen, Ted Nugent, Uncle Kracker, and more.

References

External links
 Bowling Green Ballpark - Bowling Green Hot Rods Information
 Information on ballpark

Baseball venues in Kentucky
Minor league baseball venues
Buildings and structures in Bowling Green, Kentucky
Tourist attractions in Bowling Green, Kentucky
2009 establishments in Kentucky
Defunct Midwest League ballparks
Sports venues completed in 2009
South Atlantic League ballparks